Preston was a Dano-Norwegian vessel that the British captured c.1809. As a British merchantman she initially traded with the Iberian peninsula. An American vessel captured and released her in 1812 and she foundered later that year.

Preston first entered Lloyd's Register (LR) in 1809 with Simpson, master, Ditchburn, owner, and trade London–Gibraltar.

Lottery took sails, cables, and other stores. Lottery then released Preston, which arrived at Trinidad on 15 September.

In October Preston foundered while on her way from Trinidad to London. The Register of Shipping for 1813 carried the annotation "Lost" by her name.

Citations

1809 ships
Ships built in Denmark
Captured ships
Age of Sail merchant ships of England
Maritime incidents in 1812